Jan Mertl and Yuri Schukin were the defending champions, but chose to not participate this year.
Yves Allegro and Andreas Beck won the final against Michail Elgin and Alexandre Kudryavtsev 6–4, 6–4.

Seeds

Draw

Draw

References
 Doubles Draw

2011 ATP Challenger Tour
2011 Doubles
2011 in Russian tennis